This is a season-by-season list of records compiled by Union in men's ice hockey.

Union College has won one NCAA Championship in its history.

Season-by-season results

Note: GP = Games played, W = Wins, L = Losses, T = Ties

* Winning percentage is used when conference schedules are unbalanced.† Ned Harkness resigned in December 1977 after an argument with NESCAC and Union College officials about player recruitment. The entire varsity team refused to play without Harkness so interim head coach Bob Driscoll was forced to coach the final 13 games junior varsity players. Union lost all games with Driscoll behind the bench.‡ Rick Bennett was suspended on January 19 2022 and later resigned.

Footnotes

References

 
Lists of college men's ice hockey seasons in the United States
Union Dutchmen ice hockey seasons